Ľudovít Rado (27 July 1914 – 23 May 1992) was a Slovak footballer who played as a defender and appeared for both the Czechoslovakia and Slovakia national teams.

Career
Rado made his international debut for Czechoslovakia on 25 March 1934 in a friendly match against France, which finished as a 2–1 win in Colombes. He earned his second and final cap on 24 April 1938 in a 1938 World Cup qualifying fixture against Bulgaria. He missed a penalty in the match, which finished as a 6–0 win in Prague. He later represented the Slovakia national team, making his first appearance on 6 June 1940 in a friendly against Bulgaria, which finished as a 4–1 win in Sofia. He was capped ten times for Slovakia, making his final appearance on 22 November 1942 in a friendly match against Germany, which finished as a 2–5 loss in Bratislava.

Personal life
Rado died on 23 May 1992 at the age of 77.

Career statistics

International

References

External links
 
 
 

1914 births
1992 deaths
Footballers from Bratislava
Czechoslovak footballers
Czechoslovakia international footballers
Slovak footballers
Slovakia international footballers
Dual internationalists (football)
Association football defenders
DSV Saaz players
AC Sparta Prague players
ŠK Slovan Bratislava players
Czechoslovak First League players